Achimota, is a town in the Accra Metropolitan District, a district of the Greater Accra Region of Ghana.  Achimota means "speak no name" in the Ga language. In pre-colonial Ghana, its forbidden forest was a "silent" refuge for runaway slaves.

Education
Achimota is known for the eponymous Achimota School, as well as the St. John's Grammar School. Achimota is located on the Accra highway just after Tesano and has well laid buildings, bars and a good nightlife.

Healthcare
Achimota Hospital, located near the Achimota Golf Course, is the primary healthcare institution in Achimota.

Transport 
Achimota is served by a station on the Ghana Railways.

Facilities 

 Achimota Police Station
 Achimota Golf Course
 Achimota Forest

See also 
 Achimota Transport Terminal
 Railway stations in Ghana

References

External links
 Achimota - Google Map

Populated places in the Greater Accra Region